Open Works is a 34,000 square feet "incubator for Baltimore's creative economy." It houses shared wood, metal, and digital fabrication, textiles, and electronics workspaces, as well as 150 private studios. They're also a Fab lab and have a mobile program. The $10m project's establishment was funded by Baltimore Arts Realty Corps. (BARCO), a non-profit dedicated to creating "safe, affordable, sustainable spaces for artists."

External links 
 Official Website, Open Works
 Official Website, BARCO

See also 
 Harford Hackerspace

References 

Hackerspaces